Michael James Bacsik (born April 1, 1952), is an American former Major League Baseball pitcher who played with the Texas Rangers and Minnesota Twins. 

Mike was selected by the Baltimore Orioles in the 55th round (922nd overall) of the 1970 MLB June Amateur Draft out of Bishop Dunne Catholic School. 

In 1976, Bacsik was one of 30 pitchers who pitched to Hank Aaron while Aaron had accumulated 755 career home runs. His son, Mike Bacsik, pitched to Barry Bonds when Bonds was on 755 home runs. Aaron went 1 for 2 against the elder Bacsik with a single; Bonds went 3-for-3 against the younger Bacsik with a double, a single and the record-breaking home run.  The younger Bacsik would comment, in 2007, "If my dad had been gracious enough to let Hank Aaron hit a home run, we both would have given up 756."

References

External links

The Baseball Gauge
Pura Pelota : VPBL pitching statistics
Retrosheet

1952 births
Living people
Baseball players from Dallas
Gastonia Rangers players
Gulf Coast Rangers players
Leones del Caracas players
American expatriate baseball players in Venezuela
Major League Baseball pitchers
Minnesota Twins players
Sacramento Solons players
Spokane Indians players
Texas Rangers players
Toledo Mud Hens players
Tucson Toros players
Trinity Tigers baseball players
Trinity University (Texas) alumni